Tonight, Not Again: Jason Mraz Live at the Eagles Ballroom is a live album and DVD by American singer-songwriter Jason Mraz, released in 2004. It was recorded in October 2003 in Milwaukee, Wisconsin.

Track listing

CD
"Tonight, Not Again" (Keene, Jason Mraz) – 7:55
"Not So Usual" (Mraz, Terefe) – 3:33
"Dialogue" – 0:52
"No Doubling Back" (Mraz, Zizzo) – 4:30
"You and I Both" (Mraz) – 3:39
"Absolutely Zero" (Mraz) – 6:15
"1000 Things" (Mraz) – 4:10
"Common Pleasure" (Mraz) – 5:18
"Curbside Prophet" (Galewood, Mraz, Ruffalo) – 5:13
"Sleeping to Dream" (Mraz, Stuart) – 4:13
"Unfold" (Mraz) – 8:28
"No Stopping Us" (Mraz) – 6:09
"The Remedy (I Won't Worry)" (Christy, Edwards, Mraz, Spock) – 3:39
"After an Afternoon" (Mraz, Quirolo) – 3:46
"Too Much Food" (Mraz) – 8:43

DVD
"Tonight, Not Again"
"Not So Usual"
"Dialogue"
"No Doubling Back"
"You and I Both"
"Absolutely Zero"
"1000 Things"
"Common Pleasure"
"Curbside Prophet"
"Sleeping to Dream"
"Unfold"
"The Right Kind of Phrase"
"No Stopping Us"
"The Remedy (I Won't Worry)"
"After an Afternoon"
"Too Much Food"

Personnel
The band
Jason Mraz – lead vocals, acoustic guitar, electric guitar
Noel "Toca" Rivera – backing vocals, bongos, shakers, tambourine, other percussion
Bill Bell – lead guitar, acoustic guitar, slide guitar
Eric Hinojosa – electric piano, organ, synthesizer, banjo
Ian Sheridan – bass guitar, backing vocals
Adam King – drums

Additional musicians
Kenny Anderson – trumpet
JoWestly Boston – saxophone
Johnny Cotton – trombone
John Popper – harmonica

Production
Executive producer: Bill Silva
Engineers: Pete Novak, Nick Terzo
Assistant engineer: Pete Novak
Mixing: Mark O'Donoughue, Tim Palmer
Mastering: Stephen Marcussen
Horn arrangements: James "Diamond" Williams
Direction: Nigel Dick

Charts

References

External links
Official Jason Mraz website

Jason Mraz albums
2004 video albums
2004 live albums
Elektra Records live albums
Elektra Records video albums
Live video albums